Up Jumped the Devil is a 1941 American comedy film directed by William Beaudine and starring Mantan Moreland.

Plot
Washington and Jefferson are two criminals who are just released from prison. They look for jobs to avoid being arrested for vagrancy. When reading an ad in the paper they find out that Mrs. Brown, a wealthy woman, looks for a butler and a maid. Jefferson decides to apply for the job as butler, while he convinces Washington to dress up as a woman in order to get the job as maid. As they work in her mansion they stumble upon Bad News Johnson, a crook they knew from their prison days and who eventually recognizes them. He tries to make them come along and trick Mrs. Brown.

Cast
 Mantan Moreland as Washington.
 Maceo Bruce Sheffield as Bad News Johnson
 Shelton Brooks as Jefferson
 Laurence Criner as Sheriff
 Myrtle Fortune
 Patsy Hunter
 Millie Monroe
 Suzette Harbin
 Avanelle Harris

References

External links
 

1941 films
1941 comedy films
1940s buddy comedy films
American buddy comedy films
American black-and-white films
Cross-dressing in American films
Films directed by William Beaudine
Films set in country houses
Toddy Pictures Company films
Race films
1940s American films